William Gatacre may refer to:

 William Forbes Gatacre, British soldier
William Gatacre (MP), English politician